Shropshire Hills Discovery Centre is a museum in southern Shropshire, just south of Craven Arms.

The Shropshire Hills Discovery Centre 
The museum offers exhibitions around the Shropshire Hills, an Area of Outstanding Natural Beauty and informs people about the history, geography, and biology of the area.
The exhibition includes a life sized model mammoth, Iron Age roundhouse, and a hot air balloon simulation. Other facilities include a local art gallery, gift shop, crafts room, and café.
So far more than a million people have visited this centre, since it officially opened in 2001. Shropshire Housing Association owns and manages the building, which was set up as a Millennium project to help with tourism.
The Shropshire Hills Discovery Centre was refurbished in April 2008.
In 2014 there was discussion about transferring the Centre from the local council to a housing association to save money.

Onny Meadows 
As part of the Shrophire Hills Discovery Centre, Onny Meadows has been turned into a tourist and education site to help promote the Shropshire Hills, and countryside. The name for the meadows was taken from the River Onny which flows along the 11 acres meadow site boundary. The meadow includes planted wildflowers, hedgerows, and trees/woodland, and is managed by a volunteer group.

A variety of events are held within the visitor centre and meadows, these included guided walks and talks.  Walking paths are available and are suitable for wheelchair usage on site, paths range from short walks around the site to longer circular routes starting from the centre.

Wildlife opportunities 
Discussions about a new red kite feeding station are underway. This feeding station is aimed to help the young birds survive during the winter months by providing additional food, and will also provide important opportunities for the public to see, and learn about red kites.  In 2009, ten red kite nests were found in the Shropshire Hills, this number has risen and the latest figure to be recorded is 23 in 2012.

External links 
 Shropshire Hills Discovery Centre - official site

References

Museums in Shropshire
Art museums and galleries in Shropshire